The following is a list of international trips conducted by Nayib Bukele, the mayor of San Salvador from May 2015 to April 2018 and the president of El Salvador since January 2019.

Mayor of San Salvador

President of El Salvador

Planned visits

Canceled visits

References 

Lists of 21st-century trips
21st century in international relations
Bukele
Bukele, Nayib
Bukele, Nayib
Trips